Funorte Esporte Clube, commonly known as Funorte, is a Brazilian football club based in Montes Claros, Minas Gerais state.

History
The club was founded on March 3, 2007. Funorte won the Campeonato Mineiro Segunda Divisão in 2008.

Achievements

 Campeonato Mineiro Segunda Divisão:
 Winners (1): 2008

Season records

Note: 
1)<small> After several appeals, when it came to the last sporting tribunal (STJD), Mamoré lost 6 points for fielding an irregular player. Therefore, Funorte were declared runners-up and were promoted
References: rsssfbrasil

Stadium
Funorte Esporte Clube play their home games at Estádio José Maria de Melo. The stadium has a maximum capacity of 5,000 people.

References

Association football clubs established in 2007
Football clubs in Minas Gerais
2007 establishments in Brazil